Lewoz are the traditional rural musical performances in Martinique and Guadeloupe, as opposed to the modernized gwo ka moderne.

See also
 Music of Martinique and Guadeloupe

References

Martinican music
Guadeloupean music